Baranyai is a Hungarian surname, meaning "of Baranya". Notable people with the surname include: 

 Gejza Baranyai (born 1983), a Slovak football player
 János Baranyai (born 1984), Hungarian weightlifter
 János Baranyai Decsi (16th century), Hungarian writer
 Miklós Baranyai (1934–1997), Hungarian politician
 Tibor Baranyai (born 1978), Hungarian football player
 Zsolt Baranyai (1948–1978), Hungarian mathematician

See also 
 Baranyai's theorem

Hungarian-language surnames